W33EL-D, virtual and UHF digital channel 33, branded on-air as Buena TV Puerto Rico, is a low-powered television station licensed to Caguas, Puerto Rico. The station is owned by PTR Television and its licensee is held by Caguas Community Television, a joint venture between Juan "Papotito" Rosario (which owns radio stations WOLA 1380 AM and W253DB 98.5 FM) and Ricardo Esparra Rivera (a business consultant with more experience in local events). The station's transmitter and their studios is located in Caguas are located in Cidra.

Digital television
W33EL-D's digital signal is multiplexed:

Local programs produced by W33EL-D

 Foro Central
 Beisbol de Aqui
 Desde la Montaña
 Desvela2
 Al Dia con tu Salud
 Oldies & Goodies
 Metarmofosis
 Top Music Videos
 Contralona TV
 A Buen Entedendor
 Vida Sana

References

External links
Buena TV Puerto Rico

33EL-D
Television channels and stations established in 2014
2014 establishments in Puerto Rico
Low-power television stations in the United States